The Lambeth Fire Station is the former headquarters of the London Fire Brigade.  It is a Moderne-style building built in 1937.  It included a drill tower, behind, built at the same time.  It also included a ramp to a water-level station for fireboats.  The building is a Grade II listed building.

Gallery

References

Fire stations in the United Kingdom
Grade II listed buildings in the London Borough of Lambeth
Buildings and structures completed in 1937